Ian Wrigglesworth (born 29 November 1967) is an Australian former cricketer. He played five first-class cricket matches for Victoria between 1994 and 1995.

See also
 List of Victoria first-class cricketers

References

External links
 

1967 births
Living people
Australian cricketers
Marylebone Cricket Club cricketers
Victoria cricketers
Cricketers from Melbourne